Happiness, in the context of mental or emotional states, is positive or pleasant emotions ranging from contentment to intense joy. Other forms include life satisfaction, well-being, subjective well-being, flourishing and eudaimonia.

Since the 1960s, happiness research has been conducted in a wide variety of scientific disciplines, including gerontology, social psychology and positive psychology, clinical and medical research and happiness economics.

Definitions 
"Happiness" is subject to debate on usage and meaning, and on possible differences in understanding by culture.

The word is mostly used in relation to two factors:
 the current experience of the feeling of an emotion (affect) such as pleasure or joy, or of a more general sense of 'emotional condition as a whole'. For instance Daniel Kahneman has defined happiness as "what I experience here and now". This usage is prevalent in dictionary definitions of happiness.
 appraisal of life satisfaction, such as of quality of life. For instance Ruut Veenhoven has defined happiness as "overall appreciation of one's life as-a-whole." Kahneman has said that this is more important to people than current experience.

Some usages can include both of these factors. Subjective well-being (swb) includes measures of current experience (emotions, moods, and feelings) and of life satisfaction. For instance Sonja Lyubomirsky has described happiness as "the experience of joy, contentment, or positive well-being, combined with a sense that one's life is good, meaningful, and worthwhile." Eudaimonia, is a Greek term variously translated as happiness, welfare, flourishing, and blessedness. Xavier Landes has proposed that happiness include measures of subjective wellbeing, mood and eudaimonia.

These differing uses can give different results. Whereas Nordic countries often score highest on swb surveys, South American countries score higher on affect-based surveys of current positive life experiencing.

The implied meaning of the word may vary depending on context, qualifying happiness as a polyseme and a fuzzy concept.

A further issue is when measurement is made; appraisal of a level of happiness at the time of the experience may be different from appraisal via memory at a later date.

Some users accept these issues, but continue to use the word because of its convening power.

Changes of meaning over time
Happiness may have had a different meaning at the time of drafting of the US Declaration of Independence compared to now.

Measurement

People have been trying to measure happiness for centuries. In 1780, the English utilitarian philosopher Jeremy Bentham proposed that as happiness was the primary goal of humans it should be measured as a way of determining how well the government was performing.

Today, happiness is typically measured using self-report surveys. Self-reporting is prone to cognitive biases and other sources of errors, such as peak–end rule. Studies show that memories of felt emotions can be inaccurate. Affective forecasting research shows that people are poor predictors of their future emotions, including how happy they will be.

Happiness economists are not overly concerned with philosophical and methodological issues and continue to use questionaries to measure average happiness of populations.

Several scales have been developed to measure happiness:
 The Subjective Happiness Scale (SHS) is a four-item scale, measuring global subjective happiness from 1999. The scale requires participants to use absolute ratings to characterize themselves as happy or unhappy individuals, as well as it asks to what extent they identify themselves with descriptions of happy and unhappy individuals.
 The Positive and Negative Affect Schedule (PANAS) from 1988 is a 20-item questionnaire, using a five-point Likert scale (1 = very slightly or not at all, 5 = extremely) to assess the relation between personality traits and positive or negative affects at "this moment, today, the past few days, the past week, the past few weeks, the past year, and in general". A longer version with additional affect scales was published 1994.
 The Satisfaction with Life Scale (SWLS) is a global cognitive assessment of life satisfaction developed by Ed Diener. A seven-point Likert scale is used to agree or disagree with five statements about one's life.
 The Cantril ladder method has been used in the World Happiness Report. Respondents are asked to think of a ladder, with the best possible life for them being a 10, and the worst possible life being a 0. They are then asked to rate their own current lives on that 0 to 10 scale.
 Positive Experience; the survey by Gallup asks if, the day before, people experienced enjoyment, laughing or smiling a lot, feeling well-rested, being treated with respect, learning or doing something interesting. 9 of the top 10 countries in 2018 were South American, led by Paraguay and Panama. Country scores range from 85 to 43.

Since 2012, a World Happiness Report has been published. Happiness is evaluated, as in "How happy are you with your life as a whole?", and in emotional reports, as in "How happy are you now?," and people seem able to use happiness as appropriate in these verbal contexts. Using these measures, the report identifies the countries with the highest levels of happiness. In subjective well-being measures, the primary distinction is between cognitive life evaluations and emotional reports.

The UK began to measure national well-being in 2012, following Bhutan, which had already been measuring gross national happiness.

Academic economists and international economic organizations are arguing for and developing multi-dimensional dashboards which combine subjective and objective indicators to provide a more direct and explicit assessment of human wellbeing. There are many different contributors to adult wellbeing, that happiness judgements partly reflect the presence of salient constraints, and fairness, autonomy, community and engagement are key aspects of happiness and wellbeing throughout the life course. Although these factors play a role in happiness, they do not all need to improve simultaneously to help one achieve an increase in happiness. 

Happiness has been found to be quite stable over time.

Philosophy

Relation to morality
Philosophy of happiness is often discussed in conjunction with ethics. Traditional European societies, inherited from the Greeks and from Christianity, often linked happiness with morality, which was concerned with the performance in a certain kind of role in a certain kind of social life.

Happiness remains a difficult term for moral philosophy. Throughout the history of moral philosophy, there has been an oscillation between attempts to define morality in terms of consequences leading to happiness and attempts to define morality in terms that have nothing to do with happiness at all.

Connections between happiness and morality have been studied in a variety of ways in psychology. Empirical research suggests that laypeople's judgments of a person's happiness in part depend on perceptions of that person's morality, suggesting that judgments of others' happiness involve moral evaluation. A large body of research also suggests that engaging in prosocial behavior can increase happiness.

Ethics
Ethicists have made arguments for how humans should behave, either individually or collectively, based on the resulting happiness of such behavior. Utilitarians, such as John Stuart Mill and Jeremy Bentham, advocated the greatest happiness principle as a guide for ethical behavior. Critics of this view include Thomas Carlyle, Ferdinand Tönnies and others within the German philosophical tradition.

Aristotle
Aristotle described eudaimonia (Greek: εὐδαιμονία) as the goal of human thought and action. Eudaimonia is often translated to mean happiness, but some scholars contend that "human flourishing" may be a more accurate translation. Aristotle's use of the term in Nicomachiean Ethics extends beyond the general sense of happiness.

In the Nicomachean Ethics, written in 350 BCE, Aristotle stated that happiness (also being well and doing well) is the only thing that humans desire for their own sake, unlike riches, honour, health or friendship. He observed that men sought riches, or honour, or health not only for their own sake but also in order to be happy. For Aristotle the term eudaimonia, which is translated as 'happiness' or 'flourishing' is an activity rather than an emotion or a state. Eudaimonia (Greek: εὐδαιμονία) is a classical Greek word consists of the word "eu" ("good" or "well-being") and "daimōn" ("spirit" or "minor deity", used by extension to mean one's lot or fortune). Thus understood, the happy life is the good life, that is, a life in which a person fulfills human nature in an excellent way.

Specifically, Aristotle argued that the good life is the life of excellent rational activity. He arrived at this claim with the "Function Argument". Basically, if it is right, every living thing has a function, that which it uniquely does. For Aristotle human function is to reason, since it is that alone which humans uniquely do. And performing one's function well, or excellently, is good. According to Aristotle, the life of excellent rational activity is the happy life. Aristotle argued a second-best life for those incapable of excellent rational activity was the life of moral virtue. 

The key question Aristotle seeks to answer is "What is the ultimate purpose of human existence?" A lot of people are seeking pleasure, health, and a good reputation. It is true that those have a value, but none of them can occupy the place of the greatest good for which humanity aims. It may seem like all goods are a means to obtain happiness, but Aristotle said that happiness is always an end in itself.

Nietzsche
Friedrich Nietzsche critiqued the English Utilitarians' focus on attaining the greatest happiness, stating that "Man does not strive for happiness, only the Englishman does". Nietzsche meant that making happiness one's ultimate goal and the aim of one's existence, in his words "makes one contemptible." Nietzsche instead yearned for a culture that would set higher, more difficult goals than "mere happiness." He introduced the quasi-dystopic figure of the "last man" as a kind of thought experiment against the utilitarians and happiness-seekers.

These small, "last men" who seek after only their own pleasure and health, avoiding all danger, exertion, difficulty, challenge, struggle are meant to seem contemptible to Nietzsche's reader. Nietzsche instead wants us to consider the value of what is difficult, what can only be earned through struggle, difficulty, pain and thus to come to see the affirmative value suffering and unhappiness truly play in creating everything of great worth in life, including all the highest achievements of human culture, not least of all philosophy.

Causes and achievement methods 

Theories on how to achieve happiness include "encountering unexpected positive events", "seeing a significant other", and "basking in the acceptance and praise of others".
Some others believe that happiness is not solely derived from external, momentary pleasures.

Research on positive psychology, well-being, eudaimonia and happiness, and the theories of Diener, Ryff, Keyes, and Seligmann covers a broad range of levels and topics, including "the biological, personal, relational, institutional, cultural, and global dimensions of life." The psychiatrist George Vaillant and the director of longitudinal Study of Adult Development at Harvard University Robert J. Waldinger found that those who were happiest and healthier reported strong interpersonal relationships. Research showed that adequate sleep contributes to well-being. Good mental health and good relationships contribute more than income to happiness. In 2018, Laurie R. Santos course titled "Psychology and the Good Life" became the most popular course in the history of Yale University and was made available for free online to non-Yale students.

Some commentators focus on the difference between the hedonistic tradition of seeking pleasant and avoiding unpleasant experiences, and the eudaimonic tradition of living life in a full and deeply satisfying way. Kahneman has said that "“When you look at what people want for themselves, how they pursue their goals, they seem more driven by the search for satisfaction than the search for happiness.”

Self-fulfilment theories

Maslow's hierarchy of needs is a pyramid depicting the levels of human needs, psychological, and physical. When a human being ascends the steps of the pyramid, self-actualization is reached. Beyond the routine of needs fulfillment, Maslow envisioned moments of extraordinary experience, known as peak experiences, profound moments of love, understanding, happiness, or rapture, during which a person feels more whole, alive, self-sufficient, and yet a part of the world. This is similar to the flow concept of Mihály Csíkszentmihályi. The concept of flow is the idea that after our basic needs are met we can achieve greater happiness by altering our consciousness by becoming so engaged in a task that we lose our sense of time. Our intense focus causes us to forget any other issues, which in return promotes positive emotions.

Erich Fromm said "Happiness is the indication that man has found the answer to the problem of human existence: the productive realization of his potentialities and thus, simultaneously, being one with the world and preserving the integrity of his self. In spending his energy productively he increases his powers, he „burns without being consumed.""

Self-determination theory relates intrinsic motivation to three needs: competence, autonomy, and relatedness.

Ronald Inglehart has traced cross-national differences in the level of happiness based on data from the World Values Survey. He finds that the extent to which a society allows free choice has a major impact on happiness. When basic needs are satisfied, the degree of happiness depends on economic and cultural factors that enable free choice in how people live their lives. Happiness also depends on religion in countries where free choice is constrained.

Sigmund Freud said that all humans strive after happiness, but that the possibilities of achieving it are restricted because we "are so made that we can derive intense enjoyment only from a contrast and very little from the state of things."

The idea of motivational hedonism is the theory that pleasure is the aim for human life.

Positive psychology
Since 2000 the field of positive psychology has expanded drastically in terms of scientific publications, and has produced many different views on causes of happiness, and on factors that correlate with happiness. Numerous short-term self-help interventions have been developed and demonstrated to improve happiness.

Indirect approaches
Various writers, including Camus and Tolle, have written that the act of searching or seeking for happiness is incompatible with being happy.

John Stuart Mill believed that for the great majority of people happiness is best achieved en passant, rather than striving for it directly. This meant no self-consciousness, scrutiny, self-interrogation, dwelling on, thinking about,
imagining or questioning on one's happiness. Then, if otherwise fortunately circumstanced, one would "inhale happiness with the air you breathe."

William Inge said that "on the whole, the happiest people seem to be those who have no particular cause for being happy except the fact that they are so." Orison Swett Marden said that "some people are born happy."

Cognitive behavioral therapy 
Cognitive behavioral therapy is a popular therapeutic method used to change habits by merely changing thoughts. It focuses on emotional regulation and uses a lot of positive psychology practices. It is often used for people with depression or anxiety, and works towards how to lead a happier life.

Effects

Positive
There is a wealth of cross-sectional studies on happiness and physical health that shows consistent positive relationships. Follow-up studies appear to show that happiness does not predict longevity in sick populations, but that it does predict longevity among healthy populations.

Low mood is correlated with many negative life outcomes such as suicide, poor health, substance abuse, and low life expectancy. By extension, happiness protects from those negative outcomes.

Negative
June Gruber argued that happiness may trigger a person to be more sensitive, more gullible, less successful, and more likely to undertake high risk behaviours. She also conducted studies suggesting that seeking happiness can have negative effects, such as failure to meet over-high expectations. Iris Mauss has shown that the more people strive for happiness, the more likely they will set up too high of standards and feel disappointed.  One study shows that women who value happiness more tend to react less positively to happy emotions. A 2012 study found that psychological well-being was higher for people who experienced both positive and negative emotions.

Society and culture

Government 

Jeremy Bentham believed that public policy should attempt to maximize happiness, and he even attempted to estimate a "hedonic calculus". Thomas Jefferson put the "pursuit of happiness" on the same level as life and liberty in the United States Declaration of Independence. Presently, many countries and organizations regularly measure population happiness through large-scale surveys, e.g., Bhutan.

Richer nations tend to have higher measures of happiness than poorer nations. The relationship between wealth and happiness is not linear and the same GDP increase in poor countries will have more effect on happiness than in wealthy countries.

Some political scientists argue that life satisfaction is positively related to the social democratic model of a generous social safety net, pro-worker labor market regulations, and strong labor unions. Others argue that happiness is strongly correlated with economic freedom, preferably within the context of a western mixed economy, with free press and a democracy.

Cultural values
Personal happiness can be affected by cultural factors. Hedonism appears to be more strongly related to happiness in more individualistic cultures.

One theory is that higher SWB in richer countries is related to their more individualistic cultures. Individualistic cultures may satisfy intrinsic motivations to a higher degree that collectivistic cultures, and fulfilling intrinsic motivations, as opposed to extrinsic motivations, may relate to greater levels of happiness, leading to more happiness in individualistic cultures.

Cultural views on happiness have changed over time. For instance Western concern about childhood being a time of happiness has occurred only since the 19th century. Not all cultures seek to maximize happiness, and some cultures are averse to happiness. It has been found in Western cultures that individual happiness is the most important. Some other cultures have opposite views and tend to be aversive to the idea of individual happiness. For example, people living in Eastern Asian cultures focus more on the need for happiness within relationships with others and even find personal happiness to be harmful to fulfilling happy social relationships.

Religion 

People in countries with high cultural religiosity tend to relate their life satisfaction less to their emotional experiences than people in more secular countries.

Buddhism 

Happiness forms a central theme of Buddhist teachings. For ultimate freedom from suffering, the Noble Eightfold Path leads its practitioner to Nirvana, a state of everlasting peace. Ultimate happiness is only achieved by overcoming craving in all forms. More mundane forms of happiness, such as acquiring wealth and maintaining good friendships, are also recognized as worthy goals for lay people (see sukha). Buddhism also encourages the generation of loving kindness and compassion, the desire for the happiness and welfare of all beings.

Hinduism
In Advaita Vedanta, the ultimate goal of life is happiness, in the sense that duality between Atman and Brahman is transcended and one realizes oneself to be the Self in all.

Patanjali, author of the Yoga Sutras, wrote quite exhaustively on the psychological and ontological roots of bliss.

Confucianism
The Chinese Confucian thinker Mencius, who had sought to give advice to ruthless political leaders during China's Warring States period, was convinced that the mind played a mediating role between the "lesser self" (the physiological self) and the "greater self" (the moral self), and that getting the priorities right between these two would lead to sage-hood. He argued that if one did not feel satisfaction or pleasure in nourishing one's "vital force" with "righteous deeds", then that force would shrivel up (Mencius, 6A:15 2A:2). More specifically, he mentions the experience of intoxicating joy if one celebrates the practice of the great virtues, especially through music.

Judaism 

Happiness or simcha in Judaism is considered an important element in the service of God. The biblical verse "worship The Lord with gladness; come before him with joyful songs," stresses joy in the service of God. A popular teaching by Rabbi Nachman of Breslov, a 19th-century Chassidic Rabbi, is "Mitzvah Gedolah Le'hiyot Besimcha Tamid," it is a great mitzvah (commandment) to always be in a state of happiness. When a person is happy they are much more capable of serving God and going about their daily activities than when depressed or upset.

Christianity 

The primary meaning of "happiness" in various European languages involves good fortune, blessing, or a similar happening. The meaning in Greek philosophy refers primarily to ethics.

In Christianity, the ultimate end of human existence consists in felicity, Latin equivalent to the Greek eudaimonia ("blessed happiness"), described by the 13th-century philosopher-theologian Thomas Aquinas as a beatific vision of God's essence in the next life.

According to Augustine of Hippo and Thomas Aquinas, man's last end is happiness: "all men agree in desiring the last end, which is happiness." Aquinas agreed with Aristotle that happiness cannot be reached solely through reasoning about consequences of acts, but also requires a pursuit of good causes for acts, such as habits according to virtue.

According to Aquinas, happiness consists in an "operation of the speculative intellect": "Consequently happiness consists principally in such an operation, viz. in the contemplation of Divine things." And, "the last end cannot consist in the active life, which pertains to the practical intellect." So: "Therefore the last and perfect happiness, which we await in the life to come, consists entirely in contemplation. But imperfect happiness, such as can be had here, consists first and principally in contemplation, but secondarily, in an operation of the practical intellect directing human actions and passions."

Human complexities, like reason and cognition, can produce well-being or happiness, but such form is limited and transitory. In temporal life, the contemplation of God, the infinitely Beautiful, is the supreme delight of the will. Beatitudo, or perfect happiness, as complete well-being, is to be attained not in this life, but the next.

Islam
Al-Ghazali (1058–1111), the Sufi thinker, wrote that "The Alchemy of Happiness", is a manual of religious instruction that is used throughout the Muslim world and widely practiced today.

Genetics and heritability

, no evidence of happiness causing improved physical health has been found; the topic is being researched at the Lee Kum Sheung Center for Health and Happiness at the Harvard T.H. Chan School of Public Health.
A positive relationship has been suggested between the volume of the brain's gray matter in the right precuneus area and one's subjective happiness score.

Sonja Lyubomirsky has estimated that 50 percent of a given human's happiness level could be genetically determined, 10 percent is affected by life circumstances and situation, and a remaining 40 percent of happiness is subject to self-control.

When discussing genetics and their effects on individuals it is important to first understand that genetics do not predict behavior. It is possible for genes to increase the likelihood of individuals being happier compared to others, but they do not 100 percent predict behavior.

At this point in scientific research, it has been hard to find a lot of evidence to support this idea that happiness is affected in some way by genetics. In a 2016 study, Michael Minkov and Michael Harris Bond found that a gene by the name of SLC6A4 was not a good predictor of happiness level in humans.

On the other hand, there have been many studies that have found genetics to be a key part in predicting and understanding happiness in humans. In a review article discussing many studies on genetics and happiness, they discussed the common findings. The author found an important factor that has affected scientist findings this being how happiness is measured. For example, in certain studies when subjective wellbeing is measured as a trait heredity is found to be higher, about 70 to 90 percent. In another study, 11,500 unrelated genotypes were studied, and the conclusion was the heritability was only 12 to 18 percent. Overall, this article found the common percent of heredity was about 20 to 50 percent.

See also

Notes

References

Further reading

External links 

 The World Database of Happiness – a register of scientific research on the subjective appreciation of life.

 
Personal life
Positive mental attitude
Concepts in ethics
Philosophy of love
Emotions
Pleasure